The Eisstadion am Pferdeturm is an ice arena in Hannover, Germany. It is primarily used for ice hockey and is the home of the Hannover Indians.  It opened in 1959 and holds 4,608 spectators.

References

Indoor arenas in Germany
Indoor ice hockey venues in Germany
Buildings and structures in Hanover
Sport in Hanover
Sports venues in Lower Saxony